Elizabeth Watson (13 July 1900 – 27 June 1992) was a Scottish child suffragette and piper.

Early life
Watson was born at 11 Vennel, Edinburgh on 13 July 1900, the daughter of Agnes Newton and Horatio Watson, a bookbinder for George Watson's printing company. Watson was encouraged to take up piping at the age of seven or eight as her parents hoped it would strengthen her lungs against tuberculosis after her aunt Margaret died of the disease. Her first set of pipes was a half sized set made by Robertson, the pipe maker.

Involvement with suffragette campaign 
After seeing an advert for a pageant of historical Scottish women organised by Flora Drummond and the Women's Social and Political Union, Watson and her mother joined the WSPU and Watson, at the age of 9, was invited to play the pipes in the pageant. The procession, which celebrated ‘What women have done and can and will do' took place in Edinburgh on 9 October 1909 and marched down Princes Street before gathering for a rally led by Emmeline Pankhurst at Waverley Market. Watson rode on a float beside a woman dressed as Isabella McDuff, Countess of Buchan in her cage. Several weeks later when Christabel Pankhurst came to Edinburgh to attend a meeting in the King's Theatre, she presented Watson with a brooch depicting Boudica in her chariot. In 1979 Bessie gave this brooch to Margaret Thatcher, the first woman to be elected as Prime Minister of the UK.

Two years after the pageant Watson was invited to lead the Scottish 'lady' pipers at the Great Pageant in London on 17 June 1911. Later that same year, when King George V came to Edinburgh on a state visit, Watson led the 2nd Edinburgh Company of the Girl Guides and was recognised by the King as she raised the salute.

Watson continued to be actively involved in the Suffragette movement and wore hair ribbons in the colours of the Suffragette campaign to school. She played the pipes on the platform of Waverley Station as trains departed taking convicted women's rights campaigners to Holloway Prison, and she piped outside Calton Jail to encourage the Suffragettes imprisoned there.

A century later this location is now St Andrew's House, home of the Scottish Ministers and civil servants. Scotland's First Minister Nicola Sturgeon on 1 August 2019 unveiled a memorial plaque to Watson at her home in the Vennel, saying "I go into work in the morning to the place where Bessie would have played and knowing that I go in there now as the first woman to be First Minister of Scotland."

Piping career 
Watson became the only female member of the Highland Pipers' Society at the age of 14, and won a number of piping awards. She also founded the Broughton School Pipe Band, which she led for 27 years. Watson continued to play the pipes daily into her late 80s.

Watson studied French at the University of Edinburgh, and taught violin and modern languages in schools across the city. In 1926 Watson moved to Trinity, Edinburgh with her parents, and in 1945, at the end of World War II, she married John Somerville an electrical contractor.

Watson died in Edinburgh in 1992, two weeks before her 92nd birthday. She left her autobiography, practice chanter and pipes to the College of Piping in Glasgow.

As well as a piper, Watson was also a Highland dancer-performing for example at a Women's Patriotic Service League Garden fete in 1915.

References

External links 
 Bessie Watson: the youngest suffragette - Our Town Stories, Edinburgh City Council site.
 Bessie Watson - Whose Town? Edinburgh Past and Present
 Bessie Watson at City of Edinburgh Council: Museums and Galleries site
Images and article about memorial plaque being dedicated by Scotland's First Minister

1900 births
1992 deaths
Scottish suffragists
Scottish suffragettes
Bagpipe players
Musicians from Edinburgh
Alumni of the University of Edinburgh
Scottish children
Scottish educators
Women's rights in Scotland
Women's Social and Political Union